Latino children's literature encompasses works such as stories, books, and poems about Latinos in the United States, often touching on the Latino cultural experience in the U.S. This includes people of Latin American heritage born in the United States, including Puerto Rico, or those who have immigrated from Latin America, with the term encompassing their contributions to the field of writing for children in the United States. These works are oftentimes written in English but can include works written in Spanish or a mix of both languages.

Latino children’s literature has had a long history in the United States and the Americas but did not gain popularity until the 1960s and 1970s, coinciding with the rise of the Chicano movement and a new focus on multiculturalism by Latino authors. Since then there have been multiple awards created to recognize notable works and influential authors of Latino children's literature.

Thematically, Latino children’s literature often touches upon many topics including identity and immigration and follow the styles of oral traditions, folklore, and memoirs, oftentimes incorporating Spanish vernacular or phrases.

History 
A magazine published in 1898 entitled La Edad de Oro or The Golden Age, written by Cuban poet José Marti for children in the Americas is recognized as the beginning of Latin American children's literature. Beyond written pieces of literature, many of the Spanish speaking settlers who lived west of the Mississippi, as well as Spanish settlers in what is now Florida, brought with them a deep oral literature that only grew as their children were born in the United States.

By the early 20th century there were very few Latino books published. These books were not written by Latinos and usually exoticized Latin America.

Later in the century during the 1960s to early 1970s, Latino children's literature became popular alongside the Chicano movement, which embodied social issues, peace, and education. An example of this revitalization is the Colecćion Mini-libros, published in the early 1970s in English and Spanish, with bilingual versions as well, by Mexican-American author Ernesto Galarza. The collection included Mother Goose rhymes that took place in the Rio Grande.

By the 1980s The Council on Interracial Books for Children found that non-Latino authors, who wrote most Chicano books at the time, upheld white racial biases in their books. After this report, more Latino authors emerged, coinciding with a rise in Latino population in the United States. However, the amount of Latino children books actually published stayed very low, which Ruth Quiroa argues in Diversity in Youth Literature was a result of the conservative politics of the 1980s.

Latino children's literature gained additional recognition during the 1990s when author Alma Flor Ada launched a book series that explored these messages of identity. During this time the Americas and Pura Belpré awards were introduced to recognize outstanding pieces of Latino children's literature.

Currently, the amount of books that fall into the category of Latino children's literature are small, which Sally Nathenson-Mejía and Kathy Escamilla have described as indicative of ethnic children's literature as a whole. However, data from the Cooperative Children’s Book Center (CCBC) at the University of Wisconsin-Madison shows that in 1994 there were only 90 children’s books published by and about Latino people as opposed to 328 by and 242 about Latinos in 2021.

Themes 
Themes in Latino children's literature include the adjustment to American life and aspirations, the inclusion of Latino activists, and the discovery of identity. Family and community are important and consistent themes, as authors explore the relationship between these themes and assimilation, identity, deportation, and immigration to the United States. Many of the books contain messages of ancestry, roots, and the conflicting of American values. Myths and legends are also a recurring theme that allows children to tie into their cultural roots and beliefs such as La Llorona, El Duende, and La Patasola.

Latino children’s literature has had themes that have been identified by some scholars as problematic. This can be seen with the presentation of gender where Latinas are largely portrayed as domestic workers and as less competent. This is also seen in the imagery of Latin America as poor and unwelcoming, with descriptions of the region full of racial stereotypes. This negative depiction is also given to urban barrios which are treated as dangerous and poverty-ridden.

Biographical stories of famous or important Latino figures are also popular.

Style
Latino children’s literature encompasses a diverse array of stylistic choices such as the usage of metaphors, similes expressed through riddles, proverbs/sayings, tongue twisters, and nursery rhymes. Poetry is also a common practice.In order to bring authenticity to the text authors will sometimes include Spanish or Chicano vernacular and phrases, or offer a completely bilingual version of a story, a stylistic choice that is very specific to this body of literature. Adult Latino literature is known for the magical realism that is popular among Latino writers, and this style is imbued in the oral traditions and folklore that make up Latino children’s literature. In addition to magical realism, memoirs are part of the Latino body of work that is incorporated into children’s literature, with Sandra Cisneros’ The House on Mango Street being a prime example of this.

Influential Authors 

 Alma Flor Ada
 Pat Mora
 Sandra Cisneros
 Gary Soto
 Nicholasa Mohr
 Piri Thomas
 Hilda Perera
 Lucia M. Gonzales
 Leila Torres
 Omar Castaneda

Works 
Notable books include:

Friends from the Other Side / Amigos del Otro Lado (1993) by Gloria E. Anzaldúa and illustrated by Consuelo Méndez Castillo
Cuadros de familia/Family Pictures (1990) by Carmen Lomas Garza
I Am Not Your Perfect Mexican Daughter (2017) by Erika L. Sanchez 
Out of Darkness (2015) by Ashley Hope Perez 
The House on Mango Street (1984) by Sandra Cisneros
 How the García Girls Lost their Accent (1991) by Julia Alvarez
 Barrio Boy (1971) by Ernesto Galarza
 Where the Flame Trees Bloom (1994) by Alma Flor Ada
 Too Many Tamales (1993) by Gary Soto
 Child of the Flower-Song People (2021) by Gloria Amescua and illustrated by Duncan Tonatiuh
 My Two Border Towns (2021) by David Bowles and illustrated by Erika Meza
 Efrén Divided (2021) by Ernesto Cisneros

References 

Children's literature